Christopher Schreiner (born February 16, 1983) is an American guitarist.

He was described by The Wall Street Journal as "spacey, quietly flashy and intense."

Career 
Schreiner released his debut album Only Human, in September 2008. In 2011 he joined the right-wing rock band Madison Rising. They released their self-titled debut album that year and performed for protesters at an Occupy Congress event on January 19, 2012.

Awards

Guitar Player magazine's Guitar Superstar Competition – finalist – Icarus 2008

Discography
 Only Human (2008)
 ATAU: And They Are Us (2014)

References

Lead guitarists
Musicians from Norwalk, Connecticut
1983 births
Living people
Berklee College of Music alumni
Guitarists from Connecticut
American male guitarists
21st-century American guitarists
21st-century American male musicians